Granigyra filosa is a species of sea snail, a marine gastropod mollusk, unassigned in the superfamily Seguenzioidea.

Description
The shell grows to a height of 2.3 mm.

Distribution
Thios species occurs in the Pacific Ocean off the Galapagos Islands.

References

 Keen M. (1971) Sea shells of tropical West America. Marine mollusks from Baja California to Perú, ed. 2. Stanford University Press. 1064 pp
 Finet, Y., 1995. Marine Molluscs of the Galapagos: Gastropods. A monograph and revision of the families Trochidae, Skeneidae, Turbinidae and Neritidae . L'Informatore Piceno, Italy.

External links
 To USNM Invertebrate Zoology Mollusca Collection
 To World Register of Marine Species
 

filosa
Gastropods described in 1919